Thyrosticta minuta is a species of moth in the subfamily Arctiinae. It was described by Jean Baptiste Boisduval in 1833. It is found in Madagascar.

References

Moths described in 1833
Arctiinae